Puerto Rico Highway 500 (PR-500) is a tertiary road in Ponce, Puerto Rico.  The highway has both of its endpoints, as well as all of its length, entirely within the Ponce city limits. It runs east to west.

Route description

The road has its eastern terminus at PR-132 (Calle Villa), in Barrio Canas Urbano, and its western terminus in Barrio Canas. A one-lane dirt road leads to PR-549 from there. The only major road PR-500 intersects is Avenida Baramaya (PR-9), at km 0.8. Prior to that, at km 0.3, PR-500 connects to PR-163 (Avenida Las Américas). The road ends at km 2.3, where the Vertedero Municipal de Ponce (Ponce's Municipal Waste Yard) is located. From km 2.3 an unmarked dirt road leads to PR-549, which leads to barrio Quebrada Limón in the western portion of the municipality of Ponce.

In the 2000s decade, PR-500 was no longer transited by the oversized Ponce Cement (now CEMEX) trucks. Highway 500 is about one and one-half miles long, making one of the shortest highways in Puerto Rico. It is lined by residential areas with a short section lined by the Calle Villa Final industrial park, a light-industry industrial park.

In August 2011, Senator Larry Seilhamer Rodríguez presented a bill into the Puerto Rico Senate that would extend PR-500 westward to connect with PR-2 in the area Guayanilla.

History
The highway is a wide two-way roadway originally designed to accommodate the oversized trucks used by the Ponce Cement, Inc. plant in barrio Magueyes, on road PR-123.  The trucks were used to transport limestone soil from the northern slopes of the western barrio Canas hills, near barrio Tallaboa in Peñuelas to the cement plant on PR-123. The road runs from its eastern terminus at PR-132 (Calle Villa), which is the road leading from Guayanilla to Ponce through Peñuelas, to its western terminus at Barrio Canas where it ends at the Ponce Municipal Waste and Recycling Yard.

Major intersections

See also

 List of highways in Ponce, Puerto Rico
 List of highways numbered 500

References

External links

 Historia de las Carreteras de Puerto Rico. Retrieved 11 March 2010. 
 Roads in Porto Rico. By Manuel Victor Domenech, Former Commissioner of the Interior, in The Overland Monthly. Vol 73, No, 4; April, 1919. Page 321. Retrieved 11 March 2010.
 Guía de Carreteras Principales, Expresos y Autopistas 

500
Roads in Ponce, Puerto Rico